Mohammad Khorrami (also Khorami) is a retired Iranian freestyle wrestler who won a silver medal at the 1974 Asian Games. His brother Reza Khorrami also won a silver medal at the same competition, but in a 90 kg division.

References

Living people
Iranian male sport wrestlers
Wrestlers at the 1974 Asian Games
Asian Games silver medalists for Iran
Medalists at the 1974 Asian Games
Asian Games medalists in wrestling
Year of birth missing (living people)
20th-century Iranian people